The Moldova national rugby union team, nicknamed Haiducii, are a Rugby Europe national team that play in the Conference 2 North competition and are administered by the Moldovan Rugby Federation. They are yet to qualify for the Rugby World Cup.

History

Moldova played their first international on October 10, 1991 against Lithuania. Moldova won the match, 22 points to six. The next year they played against Bulgaria, which Moldova won, 42 points to three. Moldova played Hungary in 1995, which they won, by three points, 17 to 14.

They played Georgia, who defeated them 47 to five. They then played  Ukraine and Latvia and Bulgaria soon after.

Moldova played twice in 1997, defeating Norway and losing to Croatia. They won a number of fixtures in 2000. They played the Netherlands the following year. The national rugby team was designated by the members of Moldova's Sports Press Association as the best Moldovan team in 2004. Following this, they played in qualifying tournaments for the 2007 Rugby World Cup European qualifiers.
Moldova were grouped in Pool B of the second round, and they won two of their four matches, which saw them finish second in their pool behind Germany, and thus move onto round three and enter Pool A in round 3.

However, their road to the World Cup was ended when a respectful 2nd place above Poland, Netherlands and Andorra was not enough to proceed to round 4.

Popularity
The popularity of rugby in Moldova is growing rapidly, with well over 1,250 fans regularly turning up to their home matches in the European Nations Cup. Since 2004, the number of Moldovan rugby players has more than doubled, due to the national team's growing international reputation.

Notable players
Moldovan international Alexei Cotruţa was the top try-scorer in the Russian Professional Rugby League in 2006, scoring 16 tries in 14 matches for Moscow-area side VVA-Podmoskovye.
 
During March 2011, Vadim Cobîlaş signed for Aviva Premiership side, Sale Sharks. Shortly after, his younger brother Maxim Cobîlaş also signed for Aviva Premiership side, Sale Sharks making the two the first Moldovan players to sign for a professional English team. More recently, props Dmitri Arhip and Gheorghe Gajion have signed for two Welsh regional sides, Cardiff Blues and Ospreys.

On the 23rd of August 2018, Cristian Ojovan another prop made his debut for D2 side Aurillacois. After his impressive performances at Aurillacois, George Ojovan signed with Top 14 champions Clermont Auvergne during October 2019.

Current squad

This is Moldova`s current squad for the 2022-23 for Rugby Europe Conference 2 North.

External links
www.rugby.md
www.goldteam.md
www.facebook.com

 
European national rugby union teams
Teams in European Nations Cup (rugby union)
Rugby union in Moldova